Intrasporangium flavum is a species of Gram positive bacteria.

References

Intrasporangiaceae
Bacteria described in 2016